Oort no Kumo (Oort Cloud) is Jun Shibata's 1st studio album. It was released on 20 March 2002 and peaked at #59 in the Oricon Weekly Albums Chart.

Track listing
Nanka ii koto nai kana (なんかいいことないかな; Isn't There Something Good)
Boku no mikata (ぼくの味方; My Friend)
Henshin (変身; Metamorphosis)
Isshoni kaerou (一緒に帰ろう; Let's Go Home Together)
Yoru no umi ni tachi... (夜の海に立ち...; On the Beach at Night...)
Kaerimichi (帰り道; The Way Home)
Hon no chotto (ほんのちょっと; Just a Little)
Hoshi no yoin (星の余韻 The Lingering of the Stars)
Sukitooru tsuki~Hikikatari~ (透き通る月～弾き語り～; Transparent Moon: Hikigatari) 1
Sore demo kita michi (それでも来た道; It Nevertheless Is the Road I Came From)

1Hikigatari means to sing to one's own accompaniment.

Charts

External links
https://web.archive.org/web/20161030094458/http://www.shibatajun.com/— Shibata Jun Official Website

2002 debut albums
Jun Shibata albums